Below is a partial list of shows that were previously aired by the DZRH-TV of the Manila Broadcasting Company. This list also includes TV-produced programs previously aired by its successor, RHTV. For the current programs which are airing, please see List of programs broadcast by DZRH/DZRH News Television.

Local defunct shows

News and Public Affairs

Newscasts
Ano Ang Balita (1962–1972)
Your Esso Reporter (1962-1972)

Public affairs programs
Straight from the Shoulder (1970–72)

Entertainment

Comedy
Balitang Barbero (1965)
Etcetera, Etcetera (1967)

Variety and musical
Alright, Okay
Catch Up With Tirso (1970–72)
Darigold Jamboree
DJ Dance Time
The Nite Owl Dance Party (1970–72)

Other programs
Etchos Lang (Justo Justo)

Sports
MICAA on DZRH-TV

See also
Manila Broadcasting Company
DZRH
RHTV
List of programs broadcast by DZRH/DZRH News Television

Manila Broadcasting Company
DZRH-TV